Enterococcus is a large genus of lactic acid bacteria of the phylum Bacillota. Enterococci are gram-positive cocci that often occur in pairs (diplococci) or short chains, and are difficult to distinguish from streptococci on physical characteristics alone. Two species are common commensal organisms in the intestines of humans: E. faecalis (90–95%) and E. faecium (5–10%). Rare clusters of infections occur with other species, including E. casseliflavus, E. gallinarum, and E. raffinosus.

Physiology and classification 
Enterococci are facultative anaerobic organisms, i.e., they are capable of cellular respiration in both oxygen-rich and oxygen-poor environments. Though they are not capable of forming spores, enterococci are tolerant of a wide range of environmental conditions: extreme temperature (10–45 °C), pH (4.6–9.9), and high sodium chloride concentrations.

Enterococci typically exhibit gamma-hemolysis on sheep's blood agar.

History 

Members of the genus Enterococcus (from Greek έντερο, éntero, "intestine" and κοκκος, coccos, "granule") were classified as group D Streptococcus until 1984, when genomic DNA analysis indicated a separate genus classification would be appropriate.

Evolution

Pathology 

Important clinical infections caused by Enterococcus include urinary tract infections (see  Enterococcus faecalis), bacteremia, bacterial endocarditis, diverticulitis, meningitis, and spontaneous bacterial peritonitis. Sensitive strains of these bacteria can be treated with ampicillin, penicillin and vancomycin. Urinary tract infections can be treated specifically with nitrofurantoin, even in cases of vancomycin resistance.

Meningitis 

Enterococcal meningitis is a rare complication of neurosurgery. It often requires treatment with intravenous or intrathecal vancomycin, yet it is debatable as to whether its use has any impact on outcome: the removal of any neurological devices is a crucial part of the management of these infections.
New epidemiological evidence has shown that enterococci are major infectious agent in chronic bacterial prostatitis. Enterococci are able to form biofilm in the prostate gland, making their eradication difficult.

Antibacterial resistance 
From a medical standpoint, an important feature of this genus is the high level of intrinsic antibiotic resistance. Some enterococci are intrinsically resistant to β-lactam-based antibiotics (penicillins, cephalosporins, carbapenems), as well as many aminoglycosides. In the last two decades, particularly virulent strains of Enterococcus that are resistant to vancomycin (vancomycin-resistant Enterococcus, or VRE) have emerged in nosocomial infections of hospitalized patients, especially in the US. Other developed countries, such as the UK, have been spared this epidemic, and, in 2005, Singapore managed to halt an epidemic of VRE. Although quinupristin/dalfopristin (Synercid) was previously indicated for treatment of VRE in the USA, the FDA approval for this indication has since been retracted. The rationale for the retraction of Synercid's indication for VRE was based upon poor efficacy in E. faecalis, which is implicated in the vast majority of VRE cases. Tigecycline has also been shown to have antienterococcal activity, as has rifampicin.

Water quality 

In bodies of water, the acceptable level of contamination is very low; for example in the state of Hawaii, and most of the United States, the limit for water off its beaches is a five-week geometric mean of 35 colony-forming units per 100 ml of water, above which the state may post warnings to stay out of the ocean. In 2004, Enterococci sp. took the place of fecal coliforms as the new USA federal standard for water quality at public saltwater beaches and Escherichia coli at freshwater beaches. It is believed to provide a higher correlation than fecal coliform with many of the human pathogens often found in city sewage.

References

External links

 
Bacteria genera
Gram-positive bacteria
Pathogenic bacteria